Darreh Zhan-e Pain (also Romanized as Darreh Zhān-e Pā’īn and Darreh Zhān Pā’īn; also known as Darīzhān-e Pā’īn, Darīzhān-e Soflá, and Darreh Zhān Soflá) is a village in Zhan Rural District, in the Central District of Dorud County, Lorestan Province, Iran. At the 2006 census, its population was 362, in 87 families.

References 

Towns and villages in Dorud County